2021 Christian Democratic Union of Germany leadership election may refer to:

 January 2021 Christian Democratic Union of Germany leadership election
 December 2021 Christian Democratic Union of Germany leadership election